Hulda is a kibbutz in central Israel. Located in the Shephelah near the Hulda Forest and the Burma Road, it falls under the jurisdiction of Gezer Regional Council.

Etymology
The kibbutz takes its name from the Palestinian village of Khulda, which existed nearby until the 1948 Arab–Israeli War.

History

Ottoman rule
In 1905, the Anglo Palestine Bank purchased  of land from the Saidun tribe for a Jewish settlement near the Jaffa–Jerusalem railway. Ownership of the land was transferred to the Jewish National Fund which turned it over to the Palestine Office of the Zionist Organization (ZO). In 1909, the Hulda farm was established and a building (today Herzl House) was constructed to house the manager of the farm and was later used by the kibbutz members.

British Mandate
Groups of pioneers who trained at the Hulda farm helped establish Ein Harod (1921), Kfar Yehezkel (1921), Ginegar (1922) and other kibbutzim. According to a census conducted in 1922 by the British Mandate authorities, Hulda had a population of 40 Jews. During the 1929 Palestine riots, the farm was attacked and destroyed. British forces ordered the evacuation of the settlers, but barred them from taking the body of Ephraim Chizik, the Haganah commander who was killed in battle. In 1931, the Gordonia pioneer group resettled Hulda. The 1931 census mentions 49 inhabitants, with one residential house. The farm suffered several more attacks during the 1936–1939 Arab revolt in Palestine.

1948 Arab–Israeli War
During the 1948 Arab–Israeli War it served as the headquarters of the Palmach's Yiftach Brigade and a base for convoys bringing supplies to Jerusalem. After the first truce the Harel Brigade 4th Battalion, Company B, also had its headquarters at Hulda. The kibbutz became a staging ground for Jewish convoys trying to break the Arab siege on Jerusalem. 230 convoys were set out to transport supplies to the besieged city, the largest of which were organized near Kibbutz Hulda.

Since 1980
In the early 1980s, membership was about 220, but financial difficulties led to the exodus of many families, leaving only half that number. The kibbutz has since been privatized.

Economy
The Hulda vineyard, covering over 1,200 dunams, is the largest single vineyard in Israel. Hulda Transformers, established in 1975, produces and distributes transformers and power supplies for commercial, military and medical equipment. Yarok al Hamayim is a banquet facility at Kibbutz Hulda.

Notable people

 Ron Huldai, (whose father took the family surname from the name of the kibbutz)
 Pinhas Lavon 
 Amos Oz, writer

References

External links
Official website

Kibbutzim
Kibbutz Movement
Populated places in Central District (Israel)
1929 Palestine riots